The M103 Heavy Tank (officially designated 120mm Gun Combat Tank M103, initially T43)  was a heavy tank that served in the United States Army and the United States Marine Corps during the Cold War.  Introduced in 1957, it served through 1974, by which time evolution of the concept of a main battle tank considered heavy tanks obsolete.

Design and development 
In December 1950 the U.S. Army made blueprints for a heavy tank reference design. In January 1951 it awarded Chrysler a $99 million contract to produce the tank. Chrysler tasked Robert T. Keller, the son of Chrysler Board Chairman K.T. Keller, with overseeing its design, and construction at the company's new Newark, Delaware, tank plant.

The first T43 pilot model was completed in November 1951. Officials said the tank would "out-slug any land-fighting machine ever built."

Like the contemporary British Conqueror, the M103 was designed to counter Soviet heavy tanks, such as the later IS-series tanks or the T-10 if conflict with the Eastern Bloc broke out. Its long-ranged 120 mm cannon was designed to destroy enemy tanks at extreme distances.

Some 300 tanks were built in 1953–54, initially designated T43E1. Details about the tank, including production plans and specifications, were tightly held. Seeking to keep the tank out of public sight, Secretary of Defense Charles E. Wilson nixed an October 1953 exhibition for the American Ordnance Association at Aberdeen Proving Ground. In May 1954 the tank was debuted publicly at a demonstration at the Newark tank plant.

In 1953 the Pentagon began a reversal of the President Truman administration policy of a broad production base in favor of Wilson's "single, efficient producer" concept. In September Wilson chose General Motors over Chrysler to take over production of the M48 Patton. General Motors would also become heir to any additional T43 orders after Chrysler tank production wrapped up in June 1954.

Testing was unsatisfactory, with the tanks failing to meet Continental Army Command's standards and being put into storage in August 1955. Following the approval of 98 improvements the tank was redesignated the M103 Heavy Tank in April 1956. Of the 300 T43E1s built, 80 went to the US Army (74 of which were rebuilt to M103 standard), and 220 were accepted by the US Marine Corps, to be used as infantry support, rebuilt successively to improved M103A1 then M103A2 standards.

A House Government Operations subcommittee report in July 1957 called for the heavy tank program to be audited. Investigators had been unable to determine the cost of the program, which was estimated in the hundreds of millions of dollars. The report said the Army had hastened production of the tank for war in Korea despite there being no need for it there. The tank was also unsuited to the rigors of the nuclear battlefield, the report said.

Specifics
Following contemporary American design philosophy, the M103 was built with a two-piece, cast elliptic armor scheme, similar to the M48's design. It featured seven road wheels per side, mounted with long-arm independent torsion bars. The  track was shoed in steel backed rubber chevron tracks, allowing for a ground pressure of 12.9 psi.

Initial production versions suffered a host of drivetrain mechanical problems. The Continental powerpack, shared by the much lighter M48/M60 tanks, was insufficient to drive the much heavier M103. The resulting performance of the tank was dismal; being severely underpowered and very fuel intensive. This presented a host of logistical problems for the vehicle, most prominently the extremely limited range of just . Though this was partially corrected with the introduction of the AV-1790-2 diesel unit, it would remain cumbersome and fuel-thirsty for the majority of its service life.

For ease of production, many of the large components of the tank were made from cast armor. This design scheme was also much more mass efficient than traditional rolled plate armor. Despite being better protected than the T29-series of prototypes which preceded it, the M103 was nearly 10 tons lighter, making it competitive with the Soviet T-10/IS-8 tank. The frontal hull glacis was a compound pike, welded at the center seam, with up to 10 inches thick armor at the front. The turret was a massive single-piece cast design, fitted with heavily sloped 10-inch (254 mm) rolled-homogeneous armor.

The M103 was designed to mount the 120 mm M58 gun, fitted in the M89 turret mount. The commander could select from 34 rounds of either M358 Armor-Piercing Ballistic Cap Tracer Rounds or M469 HEAT shells, mounted at the rear of the turret and in the hull. With both loaders, the maximum firing rate of the gun was five rounds per minute, owing to the design of the two-piece ammunition. Using the electrohydraulic turret traverse, the gunner could turn the turret at 18 degrees per second, with 15 degrees of elevation and 8 degrees of gun depression.

The armor was made from welded rolled and cast homogeneous steel of varying thickness.

Service 
 

US Army 7th Army wanted the new heavy tank to supplement its M48 tanks. In Europe, the US Army fielded only one battalion of heavy tanks, from January 1958, originally assigned to the 899th Tank Battalion, later re-designated the 2d Battalion, 33d Armor. The US Army heavy armor battalion, in contrast to other armor units, was organized into four tank companies, composed of six platoons each, of which each platoon contained three M103s, for a total of 18 tanks per company. Standard US Army armor battalions at the time had three companies per battalion, each with three five-tank platoons, with 17 tanks per company (two tanks were in headquarters platoon). 

One of the flaws of M103 vehicle was it did not have adequate reliability in retreat operations. US Army was aware that more Tiger tanks had been lost during retreat operations than during actual combat, and US Army in Europe could not afford that. In Europe it was found that the engine was underpowered, requiring replacement of engines and transmissions after only about 500 miles. 

In addition, the ammunition stowage was not convenient and repeated firing  caused excess chamber erosion, tracks were easily thrown. Last but not least crew safety, comfort and ability to function were impaired by poor interior arrangement. 

The M103 was placed on the road to obsolescence when the US Army shifted to the concept of a single main battle tank optimizing firepower, protection, and mobility in a single medium tank design.  The U.S. M60 tank fulfilled the breakthrough functions of M103 heavy tank while retaining the mobility of M48 medium tanks. By that time it was years since US Army had realized Soviet heavy tanks were not as potent as suspected, and thus the M103s were rather overkill and expensive to deal with T-54/55 tanks.

The US Marine Corps assigned one M103 company to each of its three Marine tank battalions, including its Marine reserve units. The M103 was never used in combat.

While the US Army deactivated its heavy armor units with the reception of the new M60 series main battle tanks in 1963, the remaining M103s stayed within the US Marine Corps inventory until they began receiving the M60 series main battle tank. With the disappearance of the heavy tank from US forces came the full acceptance of the main battle tank in 1960 for the US Army, and 1973 for the US Marine Corps. Although the later M1 Abrams main battle tank utilizes the same caliber of main gun, 120 mm, the M103's cannon was a rifled gun firing a separate-loading round, in which the projectile was loaded into the breech, followed by a cartridge case consisting of a brass case, primer, and propellant in a fixed unit. This separate-loading system necessitated the use of two loaders. The only part of the cartridge case consumed during firing was the propellant and a plastic cap on the end of the brass cartridge case. The spent brass cartridge case was ejected after firing. The M1 tank's 120 mm main gun is a smooth bore firing a semi-caseless round, ejecting only a back cap of the original loaded round; the bulk of the M1's 120 mm shell casing is consumed during firing.

Ammunition 

Ammunition for M103's M58 gun included:

M358 APBC-T
M356 HE-T
M357 WP-T
M359E2 TP-T
M469 HEAT-T

Variants 
T43 – Six pilot vehicles produced in 1951.
 T43E1 – 300 built in 1953.
 T43E2 – Two vehicles produced from 1955–56. Turret basket and gunner moved to front of turret. New targeting system (T52 rangefinder, T33 computer, T44 gunners periscopic sight) and hydraulic turret traverse replaced with electric
 M103 – Produced in 1957. 74 converted into other models.
 M103A1 Produced in 1959. 219 converted or rebuilt. New sight (Stereoscopic T52) and M14 ballistic computer. Removed one coaxial machine gun. New turret electric amplidyne system traverse. Turret basket.
 M103A2 Produced 1964. 153 converted or rebuilt. New 750 hp (559 kW) diesel engine from the M60 tank, increasing the road range to 295 mi (480 km) and maximum speed to 23 mph (37 km/h). The M15 Stereoscopic Rangefinder is replaced to M24 Coincidence Rangefinder.
 Heavy Recovery Vehicle M51 Initially built 1954–1955 and modified 1956–58 to bring up to standard. Tank recovery version of the M103 heavy tank. 187 built by Chrysler.
Manned Evasive Target Tank M103A2s modified in 1977 for use as targets in training TOW missile crews (firing dummy warheads).

Operators 
 United States
 The U.S. Army operated 80 T43E1 tanks, 74 of them were later converted to the M103 standard.
 The U.S. Marines operated 220 T43E1 tanks, 219 of them which were later converted to the M103A1 then 154 were rebuilt to the M103A2 standard.

Surviving examples 

Existing M103 and M103A2s include:

References

Bibliography

External links

Heavy tanks of the United States
Cold War tanks of the United States
Heavy tanks of the Cold War
History of the tank
Military vehicles introduced in the 1950s